"Say I Love You" is a song written by Eddy Grant in 1979. The song was first released on Grant's 1979 album Walking on Sunshine.

Renée Geyer version

Australian musician Renée Geyer recorded a version in December 1980. The song was released in May 1981 as the lead single from her seventh studio album, So Lucky. The song peaked at number 5 on the Australian Kent Music Report and at number 1 in New Zealand.

Track listing
 Australian 7" Single
Side A "Say I Love You"	
Side B "Bad Side of the Blues"

 International 7" Single
Side A "Say I Love You" - 3:30	
Side B "Good Lovin'" - 3:34

Charts

Weekly charts

Year-end charts

Other versions
Lenny Zakatek released the song as a single in 1982.
Groove 21/20 remixed "Say I Love You", featuring Renée Geyer, which was released as the lead single to promote her album, The Best of Renee Geyer 1973-1998 (1998).

See also
 List of number-one singles from the 1980s (New Zealand)

References

Renée Geyer songs
Eddy Grant songs
1981 singles
1979 songs
Songs written by Eddy Grant
Number-one singles in New Zealand
Australian pop rock songs
Post-disco songs
Australian synth-pop songs
Mushroom Records singles